The Tata Nexon is a subcompact crossover SUV produced by the Indian automaker Tata Motors since 2017. It is the first crossover SUV from the brand, and occupies the sub-4 metre crossover SUV segment in India.

Overview 

The Nexon made its debut as a prototype exhibited at the Auto Expo 2014. The final model was presented in February 2016.

The Nexon is based on the revised Tata X1 platform debuted in 1998 with the Indica model and adopted by other Indian brand cars. It uses independent MacPherson dual-path strut with coil spring front suspensions and rear twist-beam with coil spring and shock absorber. It is characterised by two-tone paint, LED headlamps and large chrome bands along the side.

Tata Nexon is available in seven variants – XE, XM, XMA, XZ, XZ+, and XZA+. The automatic versions have 3 different driving settings. In 2018, Tata added a sunroof option.

Production at the FCA India Ranjangaon plant under a joint venture agreement started in July 2017 and sales in India started since September of the same year. As of December 2018, Tata Motors has not exported the car outside India. The company has not confirmed if the car will be exported to Europe either. In August 2018 the 50,000th Nexon rolled out of the factory.

Facelift 
Tata Motors launched the facelifted Nexon with feature additions and Bharat Stage 6-compliant engines in January 2020, and showcased to the general public in the Auto Expo 2020. The Nexon received major changes on the exterior, now based on the Impact 2.0 design language.

Editions

Dark
Tata Nexon Dark edition was launched on July 7, 2021. It is available in the XZ+ and XZ+(O) trim in both diesel and petrol engine. It is finished in Atlas Black paint, and also has darkened cosmetic elements such as the leatherette upholstery, alloy wheels and trim inserts. This edition is also available in the Electric Version.

Kaziranga
Tata Nexon Kaziranga edition was launched on 23 February 2022. Comes equipped with an air purifier, ventilated front seats, and an auto-dimming IRVM. For exterior design, the model gets a Grassland Beige paint with contrast black elements such as the ORVMs and the roof. It also features Rhino badging on the front fenders.

Jet
Tata Nexon Jet Edition Was Launched on 27 August 2022. It Feels like Business Jet Comes equipted in Air Purifier and Ventilated Front Seated. Exterior Colour Was Starlight with White Roof. Wheels Colour Was Jet Black Alloy Wheels. It features #JET badging on the front fenders. This edition is also available in the Electric Version in Normal and Long Range. In February 2023 The Nexon Jet Edition Was Discontinued due to low sales.

Safety 
The Nexon was first crash-tested by Global NCAP in August 2018 and scored four stars for adult occupant protection and three stars for child occupant protection.

Tata presented kneemapping data to have some penalties removed, and made a seatbelt reminder for the front passenger a standard fitment for production from December 7, 2018. They then funded a reassessment, including evaluation of the added seatbelt reminder and a basic ECE Regulation 95 side impact test required for the maximum five star rating for adult protection.

In December 2018, the Nexon became the first ever car model sold in India to achieve the maximum five star rating for adult protection in the tests (similar to Latin NCAP 2013).

Nexon EV 

The electric version of the Nexon was revealed on 19 December 2019. The Nexon EV uses components from Tata Motors' electric vehicle technology brand Ziptron. It has a 30.2 kWh battery with an ARAI rated range of up to 312 km.

The battery can be fully charged in under 8 hours using a complimentary AC charger. It can also be charged using a 15-ampere power cable that can be used at any place with the necessary power socket. DC 25 kW fast charging can be used to charge the battery from 0 to 80% in 1 hour.

Tata started a subscription plan for the Nexon EV in August 2020. It was reported that Nexon EV was the best-selling electric vehicle in India in 2020.

Tata Motors has updated the name of the standard Tata Nexon EV to Tata Nexon EV Prime. This is done to differentiate with higher range model Nexon EV Max. Nexon Ev Prime now gets four-stage regen braking, cruise control and iTPMS.

Nexon EV Max 
In May 2022, Tata launched the long range version of the Nexon EV's the Nexon EV Max.

Sales

References

External links 

 

2010s cars
Mini sport utility vehicles
Crossover sport utility vehicles
Front-wheel-drive vehicles
Nexon
Cars introduced in 2017
Production electric cars
Global NCAP small family cars